No Sanctuary may refer to:
 No Sanctuary (album), an album by Amebix
 "No Sanctuary" (The Walking Dead), an episode of The Walking Dead TV series